Khugan (also Romanized as Khūgān and Khowgān; also known as Khūgān-e Bālā, Khūgān-e ‘Olyá, and Kūkān) is a village in Salehan Rural District, in the Central District of Khomeyn County, Markazi Province, Iran. At the 2006 census, its population was 775, in 244 families.

References 

Populated places in Khomeyn County